NBC Sports Gold was a suite of over-the-top subscription streaming television services operated by NBC Sports Group; the individual services (referred to as "passes") featured coverage of sports properties from NBC Sports, often as companions and overflow for content not shown on TV.

In 2020, NBC began to wind down the NBC Sports Gold services, with contracts for its content either expiring, or being migrated to NBCUniversal's new streaming service Peacock for premium subscribers at no additional charge.

Coverage history

Cycling 
On June 9, 2016, it was announced that the "NBC Sports Tour de France Live" app would be relaunched as NBC Sports Gold ahead of the 2016 edition of the race. The rebranded service would also provide live, commercial free streaming coverage of several other cycling events for which NBC Sports was the rights holder including the  Vuelta a España and Paris–Roubaix. The service was initially priced at $29.99 for a year-long pass.

A second season of the cycling pass was announced on June 6, 2017, with the addition of new events including the UCI Road World Championships, Colorado Classic, and Volta a Catalunya. The pass also included 30 hours of 2017 Tour de France coverage exclusive to the platform.

Rugby 
In March 2017, a separate "Rugby Pass" was announced. This pass provides live coverage of every Premiership Rugby match. On October 5, 2017, NBC announced an agreement to air the Six Nations Rugby Championship. As part of the agreement, all 15 matches will be available as part of the NBC Sports Gold "Rugby Pass." In March 2018, NBC announced a rights agreement to air the European Rugby Champions Cup. Under the agreement, NBC Sports Gold will air all matches from the competition as part of its Rugby pass.

Track and Field 
The service was further expanded in April 2017 with a new "Track and Field Pass" which provided access to 25 track and field events including the Boston Marathon and Diamond League events.

Motocross 
An additional "Pro Motocross Pass" was announced later that month providing access to every AMA Pro Motocross event. This was the first pass made available to users outside the United States. In 2021, all Motocross coverage, including exclusive qualifying, will be streamed live on Peacock Premium.

Soccer 
In June 2017, NBC Sports announced "Premier League Pass." Priced at $50, the pass includes 130 exclusive live Premier League matches, a minimum of three per club, as well as match replays and original programming from NBC Sports and Premier League Productions. The matches had previously been available at no additional charge to subscribers of participating cable and satellite providers as part of NBC's now defunct "Premier League Extra Time" package. For the 2019–20 season, Premier League Pass was split into two tiers, with the cheaper "MatchDay Pass" offering streaming of Premier League matches not shown on TV, and the more expensive "Premier League Pass" adding same-day streaming of televised matches, as well as select Premier League studio programs from Sky Sports (such as Soccer Saturday and Goals on Sunday).

Football 
In August 2017, NBC Sports Gold introduced "Notre Dame Football Season Pass." This was the first pass made available exclusively to customers outside the United States. Among the eligible countries were the United Kingdom, Canada, Germany, Spain, and Japan. The purchase price was announced as $49.99 for a full season or $9.99 per individual game.

Basketball 
December 2017 saw a regional expansion to the platform with the addition of "Blazers Pass." Blazers Pass allows viewers in NBA-designated Portland Trail Blazers territory to access 15 Trail Blazers games without a subscription to NBC Sports Northwest. The first game aired as part of the package was the Trail Blazers December 11, 2017 game against the Golden State Warriors.

Motorsport 
In April 2018, NBC announced NBC Sports Gold would begin offering "IndyCar Pass" in 2019, as part of a broader agreement to extend its existing cable rights to the series from NBCSN to include NBC. NBC Sports Gold airs practice and qualifying sessions, Carb Day at the Indianapolis 500, and Indy Lights races. In November 2019, the service also introduced "TrackPass", which primarily included coverage of NASCAR's regional ARCA Menards Series East and ARCA Menards Series West series and selected practice and qualifying sessions for events, plus coverage of the IMSA and American Flat Track. The service succeeded FansChoice.tv, and was also divided into sub-packages (AFT, IMSA, and "NASCAR Roots") for individual components.

The service shut down in late 2021; NASCAR's regional package moved to FloRacing and American Flat Track moved to Fox Sports, while IMSA coverage moved to Peacock.

Skating 
In May 2018, new passes for figure skating and speed skating were announced, in partnership with U.S. Figure Skating as part of an extension to its media rights.

Golf 
On July 31, 2018, the PGA Tour announced that its PGA Tour Live service would move under NBC Sports Gold beginning in the 2019 season under a three-year deal (as "Golf Pass"); this includes featured groups coverage of early rounds prior to Golf Channel television coverage, and featured holes coverage during Golf Channel's window, as well as other supplemental content.

Skiing and snowboarding 
In October 2018, the "Snow Pass" was introduced, focusing on skiing and snowboard events (including International Ski Federation events).

Passes

Criticism
The creation of "Premier League Pass" was met with disappointment in the soccer community, with prominent soccer website World Soccer Talk describing it as "a giant step backward." The website further noted that the move was particularly harmful to fans of league's smaller clubs. The package was also criticized for not going far enough with 250 Premier League matches remaining exclusive to cable. World Soccer Talk expressed renewed concern following the 2019 update to the offering, due to the removal of match replays for authenticated cable and satellite subscribers. The website also criticized the decision not to make the new Gold replays available until hours after match completion.

NBC Sports Gold suffered serious outages on September 23, 2017, during a set of matches which included Manchester United against Southampton. The matches were moved to the NBC Sports App amid complaints on social media. NBC apologized for the outage, and offered refunds or credit to those affected.

References

External links
 Official website

NBC Sports
Internet television channels
Subscription video streaming services